Civil Air Support (Formerly known as Sky Watch/Sky Watch Civil Air Patrol/SWCAP), is a volunteer civil aviation organisation founded in 2000 in the United Kingdom. Civil Air Support federates the efforts of small aircraft, microlight and Unmanned Aerial Vehicle (UAV) pilots to assist agencies, emergency services and individuals. The registered charity provides complementary environmental, humanitarian and community support to those who would otherwise have no access to airborne assistance. Civil Air Support will not compete with established air resources and will only operate when the alternative is no air support at all.

It has over 100 members and is the "largest charitable air observation organisation in Europe".. All Civil Air Support  members are volunteers and all flights are private. Members are either pilots, observers or operate in a supporting role. Many of the charity's pilots are highly experienced, ex-military or from a commercial aviation background.

While similar in function to the United States Civil Air Patrol, Civil Air Support is considerably younger and does not have the same degree of integration with the air force/naval aviation.

See also
Civil defense
4x4 Response
Lighthouse Authorities
Incident response team

References

External links
Civil Air Support official website
Official facebook page

Aviation organisations based in the United Kingdom